The Soviet designation Project 1241 Molniya are a class of Russian missile corvettes (large missile cutters in Soviet classification). These ships were designed to replace the Project 205M Tsunami missile cutter.

Development

In the late 1970s, the Soviets realised the need for a larger, more seaworthy craft with better gun armament and higher positioned air search radars. The need for these improvements was underscored by the First Gulf War, when 12 Iraqi Osa-I-class missile boats were destroyed or damaged by short ranged Sea Skua anti-ship missiles. They were attacked by British Lynx helicopters, but the Osa crews did not notice them because they flew below their radar horizon. In the Tarantul class, both the single  main gun and the two  Gatling-type guns are used for air defence, together with a comprehensive electronic warfare suite. The boats are built by the Petrovsky yard (St. Petersburg), Rybinsk and Ulis yard (Vladivostok). The Indian Navy paid approximately $30 million each to license-produce Tarantul-I in the early 1990s. With over 30 sales on the export market the Tarantul has been a relative success for the Russian shipbuilding industry.

Versions

Project 1241.1 (NATO: Tarantul-II)

The naming convention for NATO reporting name Tarantul was a special case here. NATO called the first version of the class as Tarantul-II, given that they had a better sensor suite/equipment than the ships of the following class Tarantul-I, which was produced exclusively for export.

First version, based on the Pauk-class hull, though with a significantly increased weight. Equipped with four SS-N-2 'Styx' anti-ship missiles (either the  range P-15 'Termit' missile or the later P-20 variant with  range) and the associated 'Plank Shave' radar targeting system ( range in active mode of surveillance,  range in passive mode, with an added air surveillance capability). One AK–176 76.2 mm main gun and two AK-630 30 mm six-barreled Gatling guns, the latter CIWS system supported by the 'Bass Tilt' targeting radar. Furthermore, there is a Fasta-N SA-N-5 quadruple MANPAD launcher and two PK-16 decoy launchers.

Between 1979 and 1984, 13 ships of the type were built. Another ship, R-55, was rebuilt after its completion as a test vessel for the 'Kortik' short-range defense system for Project 1241.7.

Project 1241.RE (NATO: Tarantul-I)

To clarify, by NATO's definition, Project 1241.RE (NATO: Tarantul-I) was an export version of Project 1241.1 (NATO: Tarantul-II).

This class of ships could be distinguished by the lack of fire control radar on the roof of the bridge. Instead, the fire control radar, X-band "Garpun-Bal" (NATO: "Plank Shave"), built for the anti-ship missiles, was installed on the top of the mast. Other equipment included a small navigation radar type "Kivach-2" on the bridge roof (or MR-312 "Pechera-1" on the ships of Poland), and the gun-fire control radar MR-123 Vympel (NATO: "Bass Tilt") at the foot of the mast. Two PK-16 decoy launchers were also installed. The model of the missiles in the KT-138 launch containers were P-20 (NATO: SS-N-2B), basically they were P-15 updated with the new guidance system but with the original 40 km range.

Between 1977 and 1979, 22 ships of this class were produced exclusively for export. Only one of these ships, R-26, was retained by the Soviet Navy for training purposes. India bought five of these ships as s, and would later produce eight ships of the same class domestically. Vietnam also bought four Project 1241.RE ships from various sources over the years.

Project 12411 (1241.1M/1241.1MR) (NATO: Tarantul-III/Tarantul-III Mod)

Retaining the main armament and basic hull form of the 1241.RE (NATO: Tarantul-I) class, 1241.1M (NATO: Tarantul-III) received important upgrades. Apart from a modest but useful internal redesign, the Tarantul-III had a new type of propulsion—a CODAG (COmbined Diesel And Gas) system. Two M-70 gas turbines (rated at 12,000 hp each) and two M510 (rated at 4,000 hp each) diesel engines were used, being a big improvement over the earlier COGOG system both in terms of serviceability (the two cruise diesels being almost something of a Soviet 'classic'), fuel efficiency and, most importantly, service life expectancy compared to the older NK-12Ms. The maximum speed reached .

The superstructures were redesigned and the angled mast of the previous projects has been replaced by a narrow, straight lattice. The sensor position remained almost the same as the Project 1241.1. The "Pechera" navigation radar was off the roof of the bridge, with the MR-123 "Vympel" fire control radar installed. Two jamming system (NATO: "Wine Glass") were installed on both sides at the foot of the mast. The reason for this was the installation of four SS-N-22 'Sunburn' supersonic ship-to-ship missiles with a range of at least 100 km. The associated radar system is the L-band 'Band Stand' radar, with a 120 km active and  passive range and the capability to track 15 different targets. The missiles can also receive third party guidance through the 'Light Bulb' uplink (from other ships, helicopters or long range patrol aircraft). Cannon armament is retained, as were the PK-16 launchers, although Soviet Navy ships benefited from the improved SA-N-8 quadruple MANPAD launcher. At least one ship had an SA-N-11 Kashtan gun and missile CIWS installed instead of the AK-630s.

The Tarantul-III, built from 1987 on, received an improved ECM (Electronic countermeasures) suite, consisting of two 'Half Hat' and two 'Foot Ball' jamming systems, coupled to four improved PK-10 decoy launchers. At least 24 of these ships were built for the Soviet Navy before production ended in 1992.

Between 1985 and 2001, 34 ships of this class were built. After the construction of first batch of 11 ships, the anti-ship missiles were changed from the P-80 "Moskit" to the more modern model P-270 "Moskit-M", therefore the following 23 boats had a new ID: Project 1241.1MR.

The guided missile corvette R-60 was further modernized in 2005, having the two AK-630M CIWS removed, and replaced with "Palash" CIWS.

Project 1242.1/1241.8 'Molniya'

Project 1242.1 and project 1241.8 Molniya ("Lightning") are further developments of the Tarantul family of ships. The two projects has been modified and rearmed with modern missile systems like the Uran-E and are more capable ships than the Tarantul types. The ships are built by the Russian Vympel Shipyard. Russia received at least one boat for trials in the 1990s and in 1999 Vietnam ordered two vessels. Vietnam is currently the main user of the Molniya class, with two Russian made ships and six locally built ships. Vietnam started its own production line of 1241.8 Molniya ships with the assistance of Almaz Central Design Bureau in Russia. The first two locally built ships were delivered in July 2014, two more in June 2015, and the last two in October 2017. The Vietnamese ships are armed with a AK-176 76 mm gun, 16 Uran-E anti-ship missiles, four Igla-M air-defence missiles and two AK-630 close-in-weapon systems. The Indian Navy ordered four further modified 1241.8 Tarantuls, this order was later reduced to two. These last two ships of the Veer class are armed with 16 SS-N-25 'Switchblade' / URAN E missiles, a OTO Melara 76 mm gun instead of the AK-176, and MR 352 Positiv-E (NATO: Cross Dome) radar. In 2009 Libya ordered three ships, however, the civil war in 2011 put a stop to any acquisitions. Shortly afterwards Turkmenistan acquired three Type 1241.8 vessels, possibly those that had been ordered by Libya but not delivered.

The Russian Navy received two upgraded Molniya-class missile boats in early 2019; they were initially built for a foreign customer, but the contract was cancelled, so the Russian Navy acquired them. The boats replaced the Moskit with eight Kh-35U anti-ship missiles and MANPADS launcher with the Pantsir-M gun/missile system. They also had a modern radar phased antenna array. One boat was expected to operate in the Black Sea and the other in the Caspian Sea.

Current operators

One ship in service - 101 Мълния ("Lightning").

One ship in service. In 2014, Egypt showed interest in the acquisition of the P-32 (Project 12421 Molniya) missile boat but the contract was signed in 2015. In July 2015, the missile boat headed to the Mediterranean Sea and arrived at the port of Alexandria at the end of the month. The P-32 was handed over to the Egyptian Navy on 10 August after participating in the inauguration of the New Suez Canal.

Seven license-built Indian variants, designated as s, are currently in active service. The last Soviet-built vessel in service, Nishank, was decommissioned on 3 June 2022.

Three ships, all in service, homeport Mangalia.
Zborul, commissioned 1990
Pescărușul, commissioned 1991
Lăstunul, commissioned 1991

 - c. 21 ships of project 1241.1/1241.7 and project 12411/1242.1 are in service with the Russian Navy (10 Pacific, 6 Baltic, 4 Black Sea, 1 Caspian).

 Vietnam People's Navy
12 ships in service:
Four project 1241.RE Tarantul-I missile boats: 
Hull numbers: 371,372, 373 and 374.
Eight project 1241.8 Molniya missile boats/fast attack crafts:  
Hull numbers: 375, 376, 377, 378, 379, 380, 382 and 383. Six of them were locally built in Ba Son Shipyard under license.

Three ships acquired circa 2011, possibly the three originally ordered by Libya but not delivered.
830 Ederman
831 Arkadag
832 Gayratli

Two or possibly three ships ordered in 2013. Reports that two or possibly three ships would be donated by Russia in 2016. They may be the former Russian Navy vessels Kuznetsk, Groza and Burya, or vessels captured from Ukraine in 2014.

Two ships in service.

Former operators

Myanmar operated two Tarantul-class corvettes at its main surface command, leased from Russia, between 1988 and 2010. The ships were scrapped in 2011.

Four ships built.
 (434), decommissioned
 (435), decommissioned
 (436), decommissioned
 (437), decommissioned

48 ships built.

 was briefly in service with U.S. Navy, after it was transferred from the German Navy. The ship has been retired and has since become a museum ship in Battleship Cove in Fall River, Massachusetts.

Four type 1241 ships, all captured by Russia in March 2014 during the annexation of Crimea
Prydniprovia (believed hulked as floating barracks)
Kremenchuk (believed to be in Russian Border Guard service as Kuban)
Uzhgorod (believed to be in Russian Border Guard service as Novorossisk)
Khmelnitsky (believed hulked as floating barracks)

Five ships built - all retired, including , which is currently a museum ship in Fall River, U.S.A.

See also
 List of ships of the Soviet Navy
 List of ships of Russia by project number

References

Bibliography
 Conway's All the World's Fighting Ships 1947–1995

External links 

 State of the Russian Navy: Corvettes
 Project 1241 Tarantul class Guided Missile Corvette
 Bharat Rakshak Indian Navy Veer class
 All Tarantul Class Corvettes - Complete Ship List
 Guided Missile Corvette "R-109" from Russian Black Sea Fleet (with photos)
 Guided Missile Corvette "R-239" from Russian Black Sea Fleet (with photos)
 Guided Missile Corvette "Ivanovetc" from Russian Black Sea Fleet (with photos)

 
Corvette classes
Corvettes of the Bulgarian Navy
Corvettes of the Indian Navy
Corvettes of the Polish Navy
Corvettes of the Romanian Naval Forces
Corvettes of the Russian Navy
Corvettes of the Soviet Navy
Corvettes of the Vietnam People's Navy
Corvettes of the Volksmarine
Corvettes of the Yemen Navy
Corvettes of the Egyptian Navy